The Prague Marathon (also known as Prague International Marathon (PIM) and Volkswagen Prague Marathon) is an annual road marathon held in the city of Prague in the Czech Republic each May. It was founded in 1995 and has grown to become a significant event, being awarded IAAF Gold Label status. Prague's marathon course has been voted one of the most beautiful in the world.

History

The inaugural marathon was held in 1995 with the support of Emil Zátopek, a Czech runner who had won the marathon at the 1952 Summer Olympics despite never having run a marathon before.

The 2020 edition of the race was cancelled due to the coronavirus pandemic, with all registrants given the option of transferring their entry to 2021 or 2022 or transferring their entry to another runner.  Similarly, the 2021 in-person edition was also cancelled due to the pandemic, with all registrants given the option of transferring their entry to 2022 or exchanging it for a shop voucher.

Other races 

The Prague Marathon event takes place over a full weekend and comprises several events, including the Volkswagen Prague Marathon, the Volkswagen Family Minimarathon 4.2 km, the Allianz Eco Walk 2 km, and the In-line party 6.5 km - a skating event. The Hervis Prague Half Marathon, which is also awarded IAAF Gold Label status, is held each March or April.

Winners

Since its inception in 1995, the men's race has been dominated by East African runners, with Kenyan athletes in particular winning 13 titles alone. Hélder Ornelas became the first and so far only European men's winner in 2007. The winners of the women's race have been mainly Russian and Kenyan. Alena Vinnitskaya of Belarus is the most successful women's athlete however, with her three straight wins from 1996 to 1998. Eliud Kiptanui is the men's record holder with 2:05:39 hours while Lonah Chemtai Salpeter has the women's course best of 2:19:45 hours.

In 2019, El Mahjoub Dazza crossed the finish line first, but was disqualified in 2020 by the Athletics Integrity Unit for using a prohibited substance, as determined by abnormalities in his athlete biological passport.  Dawit Wolde was named the winner after Dazza's disqualification.

Key:
  Course record (in bold)
  Czech Republic championship race

Marathon

Battle of the Teams 

Battle of the Teams is an elite-only event inaugurated in 2021 during the coronavirus pandemic.

Multiple wins

By country

Notes

References

List of winners
Prague International Marathon. Association of Road Racing Statisticians. Retrieved on 2012-05-13.

External links

praguemarathon.com

Marathons in the Czech Republic
Sport in Prague
Athletics competitions in the Czech Republic
Recurring sporting events established in 1995
1995 establishments in the Czech Republic
Annual events in the Czech Republic
Spring (season) events in the Czech Republic